Rachel suum videns is a papal bull issued by Pope Gregory IX on 17 November 1234 calling for a crusade to the Holy Land and ordering Dominicans and Franciscans to preach in favour of it. It was issued before the truce between Frederick II, Holy Roman Emperor and the Egyptian Sultan, Al-Kamil, was due to expire.

References

13th-century papal bulls
Documents of Pope Gregory IX